The Barn Door Hills of north-central Connecticut are a pair of prominent rocky trap rock knobs separated by a steep sided gap. They are located in Granby, Connecticut. The hills are an outlying section of the narrow, linear Metacomet Ridge that extends from Long Island Sound near New Haven, north through the Connecticut River Valley of Massachusetts to the Vermont border.

Recreation and conservation
East Barndoor Hill is located in the  McLean Game Refuge founded by former United States Senator George P. McLean and now a National Natural Landmark. A hiking trail climbs the summit of the hill. West Barndoor Hill is maintained by the Granby Land Trust.

References

 Farnsworth, Elizabeth J. Metacomet-Mattabesett Trail Natural Resource Assessment July 17, 2004. Cited November 1, 2007.
Connecticut Walk Book: A Trail Guide to the Connecticut Outdoors. 17th Edition. The Connecticut Forest and Park Association. Rockfall, Connecticut. Undated.
 Raymo, Chet and Raymo, Maureen E. Written in Stone: A Geologic History of the Northeastern United States. Globe Pequot, Chester, Connecticut, 1989.

External links
McLean Game Refuge Map
Western Barndoor Hill Preserve Trail Map

Landforms of Hartford County, Connecticut
Mountains of Connecticut
Metacomet Ridge, Connecticut
Granby, Connecticut